The 1972 Rothmans International Tennis Tournament was a men's professional tennis tournament held on indoor carpet courts in the Royal Albert Hall in London, England. It was the third edition of the tournament and was held from 18 to 22 January 1972. It was part of the 1972 USLTA Indoor Circuit. Cliff Richey won the singles title and $6,960 in prize money after defeating Clark Graebner in a three-hour-and-six-minute final.

Finals

Singles
 Cliff Richey defeated  Clark Graebner 7–5, 6–7, 7–5, 6–0

Doubles
 Clark Graebner /  Tom Gorman defeated  Bob Hewitt /  Frew McMillan 6–7, 7–5, 6–4, 4–6, 6–4

References

Rothmans International Tennis Tournament
Rothmans International Tennis Tournament
Rothmans International Tennis Tournament
Rothmans International Tennis Tournament
Rothmans International Tennis Tournament